Krasnogorsky (masculine), Krasnogorskaya (feminine), or Krasnogorskoye (neuter) is the name of several inhabited localities in Russia.

Urban localities
Krasnogorsky, Chelyabinsk Oblast, a work settlement in Yemanzhelinsky District of Chelyabinsk Oblast
Krasnogorsky, Mari El Republic, an urban-type settlement in Zvenigovsky District of the Mari El Republic

Rural localities
Krasnogorsky, Republic of Bashkortostan, a khutor in Araslanovsky Selsoviet of Meleuzovsky District of the Republic of Bashkortostan
Krasnogorsky, Ivanovo Oblast, a selo in Kineshemsky District of Ivanovo Oblast
Krasnogorsky, Kemerovo Oblast, a settlement under the administrative jurisdiction of the town of Polysayevo, Kemerovo Oblast
Krasnogorsky, Krasnoyarsk Krai, a settlement in Stepnovsky Selsoviet of Nazarovsky District of Krasnoyarsk Krai
Krasnogorsky, Novosibirsk Oblast, a settlement in Moshkovsky District of Novosibirsk Oblast
Krasnogorsky, Orenburg Oblast, a settlement in Krasnogorsky Selsoviet of Asekeyevsky District of Orenburg Oblast
Krasnogorsky, Volgograd Oblast, a khutor in Amovsky Selsoviet of Novoanninsky District of Volgograd Oblast
Krasnogorsky, Yaroslavl Oblast, a settlement in Troitsky Rural Okrug of Pereslavsky District of Yaroslavl Oblast
Krasnogorskoye, Altai Krai, a selo in Krasnogorsky Selsoviet of Krasnogorsky District of Altai Krai
Krasnogorskoye, Tyumen Oblast, a selo in Isetsky District of Tyumen Oblast
Krasnogorskoye, Udmurt Republic, a selo in Krasnogorsky Selsoviet of Krasnogorsky District of the Udmurt Republic
Krasnogorskaya, Karachay-Cherkess Republic, a stanitsa in Ust-Dzhegutinsky District of the Karachay-Cherkess Republic
Krasnogorskaya, Kirov Oblast, a village in Yubileyny Rural Okrug of Kotelnichsky District of Kirov Oblast
Krasnogorskaya, Oryol Oblast, a village in Trosnyansky Selsoviet of Trosnyansky District of Oryol Oblast